Tullynakill is a civil parish and townland (of 317 acres) in County Down, Northern Ireland. It is situated in the historic barony of Castlereagh Lower.

History
The name Tullynakill appears in the 1615 Terrier of church property and on the Raven maps of c.1625. An inquisition on the bishop’s land was taken at Tullomkill in 1617, and in 1659 Tollenekill was the parish and Tolinkill the townland.

Antiquarian William Reeves noted in the mid-19th century the ruins of a 17th-century church next to the one then in use in Tullynakill townland. There was a church on this site in the 9th century and the ruined old church is dated 1639. A new church was built in 1826, but is now closed.

In 1836 it had a population of 1,386 people.

Settlements
The civil parish contains the village of Ardmillan.

Townlands
The civil parish contains the following townlands:

Ballydrain
Ballyglighorn
Ballymartin
Big Gull Rock
Bird Island
Castle Espie
Cross Island
Duck Rock
Gull Rock
Horse Island
Lisbane
Long Island
Mahee Island
Reagh Island
Ringneill
Rolly Island
Tullynakill
Watson's Island
Wood Island

See also
List of civil parishes of County Down

References

 
Townlands of County Down